Oscar L. Shepard (March 24, 1894 – November 23, 1980) was a politician and lawyer in Hardwick, Vermont who served as Speaker of the Vermont House of Representatives.

Biography
Oscar Leslie Shepard was born in Albany, Vermont on March 24, 1894 and was raised in Hardwick.

Shepard graduated from Lowell Commercial College in Lowell, Massachusetts in 1914 and became employed by a Hardwick law firm.

He enlisted in the Army for World War I.  Shepard served in the Ordnance Corps in the Washington, D.C. area from his February, 1918 enlistment until his January, 1919 discharge, attaining the rank of Corporal.

After returning from his military service Shepard studied law with his employer, attained admission to the bar, and became a lawyer in Hardwick.  From 1924 to 1932 Shepard served as Caledonia County State's Attorney.

Shepard was a Hardwick Village Trustee from 1933 to 1952 and Town Meeting Moderator from 1934 to 1955.

In 1936 Shepard was elected to the Vermont House of Representatives and served two terms.  He was Speaker from 1939 to 1941.

In 1940 Shepard was an unsuccessful candidate for lieutenant governor, losing the Republican primary to Mortimer R. Proctor.  From 1941 to 1945 he served on the Vermont Banking Board.

When Proctor became governor in 1945 he appointed Shepard as his executive assistant.

In the 1950s Shepard served as chairman of the Vermont Public Service Commission.

Shepard died in Morrisville, Vermont, on November 23, 1980 and was buried in Morrisville's Pleasant View Cemetery.

References 

1894 births
People from Caledonia County, Vermont
United States Army personnel of World War I
Speakers of the Vermont House of Representatives
Republican Party members of the Vermont House of Representatives
Vermont lawyers
State's attorneys in Vermont
Burials in Vermont
20th-century American politicians
1980 deaths
20th-century American lawyers